The Montserrat galliwasp or Montiserrat galliwasp (Diploglossus montisserrati) is a critically endangered species of lizard in the Diploglossidae family endemic to Montserrat in the Caribbean Lesser Antilles, the only Diploglossid species in the region.

Description
It can reach 180 mm snout-to-vent, with well-developed limbs.  It is brown all over, with white speckling on its flanks and legs, subtle dark lines around its neck, and white scales speckled with brown on its upper mouth.

Distribution and habitat
Once native to the whole island, it is only confirmed from the type locality, Woodland Spring, where it is found in moist woodland habitats.

Conservation
Its population size is unknown. It was originally described on the basis of a single specimen collected in 1964.  No confirmed sightings were reported again until 1998, when it was observed by forestry employees. It may be one of the most endangered lizards in the world, particularly given the destruction of local habitat caused by the Soufrière Hills volcano, human habitation, and predation by invasive species such as rats, cane toads, feral pigs, dogs, and cats.

References

.

Underwood, G. 1964. An anguid lizard from the Leeward Islands. Breviora 200:1-10

External links
Diploglossus montisserrati at the Encyclopedia of Life

Diploglossus
Endemic fauna of Montserrat
Reptiles of Montserrat
Reptiles described in 1964
Taxa named by Garth Underwood
Taxonomy articles created by Polbot